The Georgian Basketball Super League (Sakalatburto Superliga), also known as the Georgian Top League, is the highest professional basketball league in Georgia. The first season was played in 1991, and was won by Dinamo Tbilisi. The 1990s were dominated by BC Vita Tbilisi, who won the title a record 7 times. BC Batumi, and then Energy Invest Rustavi, dominated the following decade. More recently, the league was dominated by clubs attached to State departments, with first BC Armia (Ministry of Defense) establishing themselves as the country's leading club, and later BC MIA Academy(Ministry of Internal Affairs) winning the title.

2013/14 was the first season when none of the country's universities were represented in the Superliga. This followed the decision by the Ministry of Education to withdraw funding from professional sports teams. That season saw Dinamo Tbilisi regain the title in a convincing manner, only to lose it the following year to a rejuvenated BC MIA Academy side.

The 2014/15 season saw the introduction of a second tier in Georgian basketball, called the A-League (A-Liga). Thus, for the first time, teams at the bottom of the Superliga were in danger of losing their top-tier status through relegation play-offs. It was then announced that from the 2015/16 season, the club finishing bottom of the Superliga will automatically get relegated to the A-Liga.

2021–22 teams
 Batumi
 Cactus Tbilisi
 Tskhum-Abkhazeti (previously BC Delta)
 Dinamo Tbilisi
 Kutaisi
 Mega
 Olimpi Tbilisi
 Rustavi
 Titebi
 TSU Tbilisi
 Vera Tbilisi

Champions

Number Of Titles

Awards

Most Valuable Player

Young Player of the Year

References

External links
Official Website
Eurobasket.com League Page

 
Basketball competitions in Georgia (country)
Basketball leagues in Europe
Basketball
Sports leagues established in 1991
1991 establishments in Georgia (country)